James Kitchen ‘Kit’ Cosper (born October 21, 1967) was the sixth employee at Red Hat and one of the founders of Linux Hardware Solutions (LHS) as well as a founding director of Linux International.

After LHS was acquired by VA Linux Cosper became Director of Miscellaneous at VA and eventually managed their Open Source advocacy group, consisting of Chris DiBona, Joseph Arruda and John Mark Walker.

During the Dot Com implosion of 2001 Cosper left VA and went on to serve as Executive Technical Advisor and interim CTO at Telkonet, a powerline networking startup in Germantown, Maryland.

He was married on May 5, 1990, in Wilmington, NC to Lourie Cosper and has three children: William (born March 1985), Keifer (born April 1993) and Elizabeth (born Jan. 1996). His first grandchild Hulet James Cosper, a namesake, was born in Jan. 2019 in Elmer, NJ to his oldest son William and his wife Elizabeth Cosper née Atwill.

External links
 Then You Win - Article on Open Source and Microsoft
 Personal info page - Red Hat employee Personal info page from WayBackMachine

Living people
Geeknet
1967 births